Hugh McLaren (24 June 1926 – 8 December 1965) was a Scottish professional footballer who played as a  left winger.

Career
Born in Hamilton, McLaren played for Blantyre Celtic, Kilmarnock, Derby County, Nottingham Forest, Walsall, Burton Albion and Gresley Rovers.

He died on 8 December 1965, from cancer.

References

1926 births
1965 deaths
Scottish footballers
Blantyre Celtic F.C. players
Kilmarnock F.C. players
Derby County F.C. players
Nottingham Forest F.C. players
Walsall F.C. players
Burton Albion F.C. players
Gresley F.C. players
Scottish Football League players
English Football League players
Association football wingers
Deaths from cancer in England